Qualea dichotoma, also known as jacaré, is a deciduous tree indigenous to central and eastern Brazil. It is a common ornamental plant, used in landscaping, street planting, and gardens.

Uses

Qualea dichotoma is used prominently as decoration in Brazil, as either a garden element or as a part of landscaping. It is also used as a replenisher for low-nutrient soils. Qualea dichotoma has wood with low durability and low hardness, but is still used in constructions of low-quality tables, chairs, ceilings, and floors.

Habitat
Qualea dichotoma is native to Brazil, and can be found in rainforests, but is more commonly found in dry, sunny areas with sparse vegetation, such as savannahs.

Description

Qualea dichotoma is a deciduous tree that can grow  in height. The tree grows  in diameter, and has a thick, corky bark. The plant grows well in sunny areas with poor or sandy soil where water drains quickly. The leaves are ovate, and are arranged opposite on the stem, and the flowers are small and range from white to violet. The seeds are a light brown and the seed capsule splits into two.

References

dichotoma